Gmina Terespol is a rural gmina (administrative district) in Biała Podlaska County, Lublin Voivodeship, in eastern Poland, on the border with Belarus. Its seat is the town of Terespol, although the town is not part of the territory of the gmina.

The gmina contains part of the protected area called Podlasie Bug Gorge Landscape Park.

Villages
Gmina Terespol contains the villages and settlements of Bohukały, Dobratycze-Kolonia, Kobylany, Kołpin, Koroszczyn, Kukuryki, Kużawka, Lebiedziew, Lechuty Duże, Lechuty Małe, Łęgi, Łobaczew Duży, Łobaczew Mały, Małaszewicze, Małaszewicze Duże, Małaszewicze Małe, Michalków, Murawiec, Neple, Podolanka, Polatycze, Samowicze, Starzynka, Zastawek and Żuki.

Neighbouring gminas
Gmina Terespol is bordered by the town of Terespol and by the gminas of Kodeń, Piszczac, Rokitno and Zalesie. It also borders Belarus.

References

External links
Polish official population figures 2006

Gminas in Lublin Voivodeship
Biała Podlaska County